Tuesday Middaugh (born August 27, 1973) is a former synchronized swimmer from the United States. She competed in both the women's duet and women's team competitions at the 2000 Summer Olympics.

References 

1973 births
Living people
American synchronized swimmers
Olympic synchronized swimmers of the United States
Synchronized swimmers at the 2000 Summer Olympics